The Phantom President is a 1932 American pre-Code musical comedy and political satire film. It was directed by Norman Taurog, starred George M. Cohan, Claudette Colbert, and Jimmy Durante, with songs by Richard Rodgers (music) and Lorenz Hart (lyrics).

According to Rodgers, Cohan deeply resented having to work with Rodgers and Hart on the film. Cohan was bitter that his type of musical theatre had gone out of fashion, supplanted by the more literate and musically sophisticated shows of Rodgers and Hart, among others. During the filming, Cohan would sarcastically refer to Rodgers and Hart as "Gilbert and Sullivan".

However, in 1937 Cohan starred in I'd Rather Be Right, a musical with songs by Rodgers and Hart. (In the Cohan biopic Yankee Doodle Dandy, the segments dealing with I'd Rather Be Right only mention librettists George S. Kaufman and Moss Hart, not Rodgers and Hart.)

Plot
The Phantom President tells the fictional story of American presidential candidates, based on the novel by George F. Worts. A colorless stiff candidate for President is replaced in public appearances by a charismatic medicine show pitchman, from the day when the show included blackface makeup and eccentric dancing.

Quotes
Prof. Aikenhead: "Blair lacks political charm. Blair has no flair for savoir faire."
Peeter J. 'Doc' Varney: "I'm just trying to figure out which one of us looks the most alike."

Cast
George M. Cohan as Theodore K. Blair/Peeter J. 'Doc' Varney
Claudette Colbert as Felicia Hammond
Jimmy Durante as Curly Cooney
George Barbier as Boss Jim Ronkton
Sidney Toler as Prof. Aikenhead
Louise Mackintosh as Sen. Sarah Scranton
Jameson Thomas as Jerrido
Julius McVicker as Sen. Melrose
Charles Middleton as Abraham Lincoln (uncredited)
Alan Mowbray as George Washington (uncredited)

References

External links
 
 
 

1932 films
1932 musical comedy films
1930s ghost films
American musical comedy films
American political satire films
American black-and-white films
Films based on American novels
Films directed by Norman Taurog
Paramount Pictures films
1930s English-language films
1930s American films